Dhoraso Moreo Klas (born 30 January 2001) is a Dutch professional footballer of Surinamese descent who plays as a midfielder for Eerste Divisie club ADO Den Haag.

Career

Den Bosch
Born in Amsterdam, Klas played in the youth system of FC Den Bosch, where he played one year above his age group and each day traveled 90 kilometres (56 mi) in public transport from Amsterdam to 's-Hertogenbosch to train and play for the youth teams. Already in the 2017–18 season, Klas was included in the first-team squad, but eventually did not make a senior appearance. 

In the summer of 2020, Klas was officially promoted to the first team after having mainly played for the under-21 team for two years. He made his debut for FC Den Bosch in the Eerste Divisie on 6 September 2020, in a 2–1 home win over FC Dordrecht, coming on as a 78th minute substitute for Jizz Hornkamp. On 22 September, he scored his professional goal as a starter in the home match against MVV.

On 18 April 2021, it was announced that Klas' contract with Den Bosch had been terminated after he had informed the club that he wanted to play elsewhere after initially having agreed on a contract extension.

ADO Den Haag
In July 2021, he moved to ADO Den Haag on a three-year contract. He made his competitive debut for the club on 8 August 2021, starting in a 2–0 win over Jong Ajax. On 10 September 2021, Klas scored his first goal for ADO, securing a late 3–3 equalizer away against TOP Oss.

References

External links
 
 

2001 births
Living people
Dutch footballers
Association football midfielders
Footballers from Amsterdam
FC Den Bosch players
ADO Den Haag players
Vierde Divisie players
Eerste Divisie players
Dutch sportspeople of Surinamese descent